The 2008 Sioux Falls Cougars football team represented the University of Sioux Falls in the 2008 NAIA football season. The Cougars captured the 2008 NAIA Football National Championship with a 23–7 victory over the top-ranked . The team also won the Great Plains Athletic Conference championship with a perfect 10–0 record. This was the school's third NAIA national championship (1996, 2006) and second in three years. The team was coached by Kalen DeBoer.

Schedule

USF would start the season ranked #2 and would stay at that spot through the championship series.

References

Sioux Falls
Sioux Falls Cougars football seasons
NAIA Football National Champions
College football undefeated seasons
Sioux Falls Cougars football